Vanzella may refer to:
Ale Vanzella, Brazilian musician
Flavio Vanzella, Italian cyclist